The Queen's Medal for Champion Shot is a Canadian medal instituted on 28 August 1991 to honour one member each of the Canadian Armed Forces (CF) Regular Force and either the CF Reserve Force or the Royal Canadian Mounted Police (RCMP) who obtained the highest aggregate score in stages one and two of the Queen's Medal Competition. It replaced its British counterpart, the Queen's Medal for Champion Shots in the Military Forces, after 1992. In respect of the Canadian Regular Force, the British medal could only be won by Army members, whereas the Canadian medal can be won by members of the Canadian Forces.

History
The Medal for the Best Shot in the British Army, Infantry, was instituted by Queen Victoria in 1869 and awarded from 1870 to 1882 to the best shot of the annual army shooting competition. In 1923, the medal was re-introduced by King George V and designated the King's Medal for Champion Shots in the Military Forces. It could then be awarded to the champions of army marksmanship competitions, held under battle conditions, at annual central meetings in the United Kingdom, the British Dominions, Colonies, and India.

The first King's Medal competition in Canada was held for the Canadian Regular Force in 1923 and one King's Medal for Champion Shots in the Military Forces was awarded annually from that year. Beginning in 1963, two medals were awarded in Canada annually, the second to a member of either the Royal Canadian Mounted Police or the Canadian Reserve Force. A distinct Canadian version of the medal, the Queen's Medal for Champion Shot, was instituted in 1991 and the British version of the medal ceased to be awarded in Canada the following year.

Uniquely, it is the only medal in the long list of Canadian honours and awards that is won in open competition; all other honours are either awarded or earned.

Design

The medal was designed by Bruce W. Beatty, taking the form of a  diameter disk with a raised edge. On the obverse is a crowned effigy of Queen Elizabeth II circumscribed by the Latin words ELIZABETH II DEI GRATIA REGINA • CANADA (Elizabeth II, by the Grace of God, Queen • Canada), symbolizing her roles as both fount of honour and Commander-in-Chief of the Canadian Forces.

The reverse shows the winged mythological goddess Pheme, with a trumpet in her left hand and rising from her throne to crown a warrior with a laurel wreath. At left is the naked and cloaked warrior, with his left foot on the throne dais, a bow and a quiver of arrows in his right hand and supporting a target with three arrows through its centre on his left knee. The design, by Sir Edward John Poynter, was first used on the reverse of the 1869 Medal for the Best Shot in the British Army, Infantry.

Prior to 2002, the medal was joined to a straight suspender by a single-toe claw. After that date, the medal is suspended from a straight slotted bar with a fleur de lis decoration. The medal is worn at the left chest, suspended on a 32 millimetres wide ribbon coloured with a central vertical band in dark crimson, bordered on both sides with 9 millimetres wide black bands, each with a 3 millimetres wide beige band in the middle. The date the award was won is marked on a silver bar worn on the ribbon. The medal can be won multiple times, with each subsequent award indicated by an additional bar displaying the year in which it was won. Since 2002, the bars have been sewn centred onto the ribbon, whereas, before 2002, they were riveted to the medal's suspension, in roller chain fashion. When medals are not worn, the award of second and subsequent clasps are denoted by silver rosettes on the ribbon bar. As no more than four rosettes can fit onto a ribbon bar, for those who have won the award more than five times, gold rosettes were introduced.

Eligibility and receipt

From 1924 to 1991, the eligibility for the Queen's Medal included various combinations of regular, reserve and Royal Canadian Mounted Police.

For example, from 1963, members of the Royal Canadian Mounted Police (RCMP) competed against the Canadian Army (Militia) and from 1968 the Canadian Forces (Reserve).

From 1954 to 1967, the Royal Canadian Air Force had its own Queen's Medal.

All medal contenders have to be current serving members of the Armed Forces or Royal Canadian Mounted Police.

Two medals are awarded annually, one to the member of the Canadian Regular Force and one to the member of either the Canadian Reserve Force or the RCMP who obtains the highest aggregate score in stages one and two of the Queen's Medal Competition. 
 
On 28 August 1991 a new Canadian Queen's Medal was introduced to replace the British-style award, and was first awarded in the summer of 1992, with one medal for each of the Regular Forces and the Reserves.

Notes

References

Military awards and decorations of Canada